TVR is a British sports car company.

TVR may also refer to:

 TvR, Romansh television production unit in Switzerland
 TVR (TV network), the public television network of Romania
 Taff Vale Railway, a South Wales railway company that operated 1840–1922
 Television Rating Point, in audience measurement
 Televisión Registrada, an Argentine TV program
 Terminal verification results, for smart payment cards
 Treasure Valley Rollergirls, a roller derby league in Boise, Idaho
  (Bombardier Guided Light Transit), a public transport system
 Top-view ranchu, a type of Japanese Ranchu goldfish
 T. V. Ramasubbaiyer, Indian businessman
 Thermostatic radiator valve, Thermostatic Radiator Valve
 Trevor van Riemsdyk, American ice hockey player

See also